Hilton Food Group plc is a food packaging business. It is listed on the London Stock Exchange and is a constituent of the FTSE 250 Index.

History 
The company was established to operate a beef and lamb central meat packing facility in Huntingdon in 1994. It was the subject of an initial public offering in May 2007 which valued the business at circa £105 million. It went on to acquire Seachill, a supplier of chilled and frozen salmon, in November 2017.

Operations
The company has six factories and sells its products in supermarkets across fourteen countries in Europe. It also has a joint venture in Australia with Woolworths Group, a retail business, to undertaking meat processing activities for its stores and a joint venture in Portugal with Sonae Modelo Continente, another retail business, to provide packaged meats for its stores.

References

External links 
 

Companies based in Cambridgeshire
1994 establishments in the United Kingdom
Companies listed on the London Stock Exchange
Food processing industry in the United Kingdom